Henry Tudor School (Welsh: Ysgol Harri Tudur) is a co-educational school of 1500 students in Pembroke, Wales. Founded in 1972 as a result of the amalgamation of Pembroke Grammar School and Coronation Secondary Modern School, the Pembroke School offers education for the years 11–18. It is located on a single campus of  that has views to the historic Pembroke Castle. The buildings date back to the 1950s, with extensions added in the 1960s and 1970s. A new wing housing science laboratories was completed in 2004.

The school facilities includes science laboratories and a large hall. The school has also recently installed networked internet access and satellite technology. It is located next to Pembroke Leisure Centre, so the school uses these facilities for sports activities.

In 2015, Pembrokeshire County Council announced plans to build a new school and vocational centre on the grounds of the existing school. The plan was for the new school to be constructed and opened in time for the 2017-18 academic year, with the existing school demolished (with the exception of the science block) and replaced by sports facilities by Summer 2018. This did not happen on schedule, but the new school, named "Henry Tudor School" was built on the area of the rugby field of the original Pembroke School, and opened in September 2018.

Notable former pupils include Dominic Day who played Rugby Union for Llanelli, Exeter Chiefs and has won several Welsh caps at different levels.

References

External links

Pembroke School
Pembroke School Library

Secondary schools in Pembrokeshire
Educational institutions established in 1972
1972 establishments in Wales
Pembroke, Pembrokeshire